Thomas R. Frey (April 3, 1936 – February 11, 2017) was an American politician who served in the New York State Assembly from the 132nd district from 1973 to 1978 and as the County Executive of Monroe County from 1987 to 1991.

He died of pancreatic cancer on February 11, 2017, in Rochester at age 80.

References

1936 births
2017 deaths
Democratic Party members of the New York State Assembly